The Annals of Thoracic Surgery is a peer-reviewed medical journal that was established in 1965. It covers the fields of thoracic diseases and surgery. It is the official journal of the Society of Thoracic Surgeons and the Southern Thoracic Surgical Association.

Article retraction practice
In 2004, The Annals of Thoracic Surgery published a study comparing two heart drugs. In January 2011, the journal retracted the study. The journal's editor-in-chief, L. Henry Edmunds, was contacted by Retraction Watch to get details about the cause of the article retraction. Edmunds replied that journalists and bloggers need not discuss article retraction and that it was sufficient for the public to know that the article had been retracted. Edmunds went on to say that the reasons why a journal might retract an article are personal in the same way that the reasons for a marital divorce are.

Current editorial board

Editor
 G. Alexander Patterson, MD, St. Louis, Missouri

Past editors
 L. Henry Edmunds Jr, MD, 2000-2015
 Thomas B. Ferguson MD, 1984-2000
 Herbert Sloan MD, 1969-1984
 John D. Steele MD, 1964-1969

References

External links
 
 The Society of Thoracic Surgeons

Publications established in 1965
Surgery journals
Elsevier academic journals
Monthly journals
English-language journals
Academic journals associated with learned and professional societies
1965 establishments in the United States